Clark/Lake is an 'L' station located at 100/124 West Lake Street in Chicago's Loop district, and is accessed from the James R. Thompson Center and 203 North LaSalle building. It is one of the most complex stations on the 'L' system, comprising an elevated station and a subway station. The elevated station is serviced by the Brown, Green, Orange, Pink, and Purple Lines, while the subway platform is serviced by the Blue Line. In December 2014, it had an average of 17,644 weekday passenger entrances, making it the second busiest station in the 'L' system. The Richard J. Daley Center, Chicago City Hall, and Chicago Title and Trust Center are also served by the station. It is the busiest station on the Loop Elevated, and the second-busiest station on the 'L' system as of December 2014. This station has been recognized as the station(s) with the most pickpockets by ABC 7 Chicago.

History

Clark/Lake is a 'super-station' consisting of two stations that have been merged into one.

Elevated station (1895–1992)
The original elevated station opened on September 22, 1895 as one of three stations on the Lake Street Elevated Railroad's "Wabash extension". This extension became the Lake Street leg of the Union Loop when it was completed in 1897.

Subway station (1951–1992)
The subway station opened as Lake Transfer on February 25, 1951.

Combined station (1992–present)
From 1988 to 1992, the elevated station was reconstructed, with its main entrance in the James R. Thompson Center. This allows transfers between the elevated station and the subway station without leaving the paid area, and so the stations were combined into a single station. Due to this, it is the only station that serves six of the eight lines.  The Blue Line serves the subway station while the Green Line stops at both sides of the elevated station, Orange, Pink and Purple Line trains stop at the Inner Loop platform, and Brown Line trains stop at the Outer Loop platform.

Bus connections
CTA
22 Clark (Owl Service)
24 Wentworth (Weekdays only)
134 Stockton/LaSalle Express (Weekday Rush Hours only)
135 Clarendon/LaSalle Express (Weekday Rush Hours only)
136 Sheridan/LaSalle Express (Weekday Rush Hours only)
156 LaSalle (Weekdays only)

Notes and references

Notes

References

External links 

Clark/Lake on CTA website

Clark Street entrance to elevated line from Google Maps Street View
Lake Street entrance to Thompson Center from Google Maps Street View
Wells Street entrance to subway from Google Maps Street View

CTA Blue Line stations
CTA Brown Line stations
CTA Green Line stations
CTA Orange Line stations
CTA Purple Line stations
CTA Pink Line stations
Historic American Engineering Record in Chicago
Railway stations in the United States opened in 1895
Former North Shore Line stations
1895 establishments in Illinois